Hélène Schwab (22 November 1878 – 20 December 1954) was a French painter. Her work was part of the painting event in the art competition at the 1924 Summer Olympics.

References

1878 births
1954 deaths
19th-century French painters
20th-century French painters
French women painters
Olympic competitors in art competitions
People from Jura (department)
20th-century French women